John Edward Duncan (1884–1959) was a member of the New Zealand Legislative Council from 22 September 1937 to 21 September 1944; then 22 September 1944 to 31 December 1950 when the Council was abolished. He was appointed by the First Labour Government.

He was from Auckland then Wharepuhunga.

References 

1884 births
1959 deaths
Members of the New Zealand Legislative Council
New Zealand Labour Party MLCs